Colonel Atilla Altıkat was the Turkish military attaché to the Turkish Embassy in Ottawa, Ontario, Canada, and was assassinated in 1982. The Armenian militant group ASALA claimed responsibility for the attack. The act was forcefully condemned by the Prime Minister of Canada, Pierre Trudeau.

Assassination 
Before being assigned to Ottawa in 1981, Altıkat had been an officer in the Turkish Air Force.  He was married and had two teenage children.  Altıkat was killed on his way to work at around 9:00 a.m. on August 27, 1982.  When his car stopped for a red light on the Sir John A. Macdonald Parkway at Island Park Drive, a car stopped nearby, a passenger got out and fired nine shots from a 9mm Browning handgun through the passenger window of the car, killing the diplomat instantly.

Other assassinations 
The attack was one in a series of attacks on Turkish diplomats around the world.  On April 8, 1982, the Turkish Commercial Counsellor in Ottawa, Kani Güngör, had been seriously injured in a failed assassination attempt. Two years later, a group of Armenian guerrillas attacked the Turkish Embassy in Ottawa, killing a Canadian security officer and seriously injuring the ambassador.  While those responsible for the other two attacks were caught and prosecuted, the killing of Altıkat remains unsolved, despite the offer of a $100,000 reward for information leading to an arrest.

Memorial 
A monument was inaugurated, on 20 September 2012, to the memory of Col. Altıkat, in Ottawa. The inauguration ceremony was attended by his widow and two children, as well as the Foreign Ministers of Turkey and Canada, Ahmet Davutoğlu and John Baird, respectively.

See also
List of assassinated people from Turkey
List of Turkish diplomats
List of Turkish diplomats assassinated by Armenian militant organisations
List of unsolved murders

Further reading
 "Canada honors Turkish diplomat with monument" in Hürriyet Daily News.

References

1982 deaths
Assassinated Turkish diplomats
Canada–Turkey relations
Deaths by firearm in Ontario
Male murder victims
Military attachés
People murdered in Ontario
Terrorism in Canada
Turkish Air Force officers
Turkish people murdered abroad
Unsolved murders in Canada
Year of birth missing